The following Union Army units and commanders fought in the Battle of Peachtree Creek of the American Civil War. The Confederate order of battle is listed separately.

Abbreviations used

Military rank
 MG = Major General
 BG = Brigadier General
 Col = Colonel
 Cpt = Captain

Other
 w = wounded
 k = killed

Army of the Cumberland

MG George Henry Thomas

IV Corps

MG Oliver O. Howard

XIV Corps

MG John M. Palmer

XX Corps

MG Joseph Hooker

Notes

 Official Records permanent book link

External links
 The Confederate Forces Engaged
 The Federal Forces Engaged
 The Battle of Peachtree Creek Plaque 2 - Forces Engaged 

American Civil War orders of battle
Atlanta campaign